The Cathedral of St. Mary (or simply Cathedral of Nukualofa and also alternately called the Cathedral of the Immaculate Conception and locally in Tongan: Malia Tupu Imakulata) is a religious building located on Vuna Road in the town of Nukualofa, capital of the  Kingdom of Tonga a small independent state in Oceania. It should not be confused with the Basilica of Saint Anthony of Padua also located in the same city.

The church follows the Roman or Latin rite and serves as the seat of the diocese of Tonga (Latin: Dioecesis Tongana) which was created in 1966 by bull "Prophetarum voices" of Pope Paul VI. It is under the pastoral responsibility of the Bishop Soane Patita Paini Mafi who became the youngest member of the College of Cardinals of the Catholic Church since 2015 when he was appointed cardinal by Pope Francis.

References

Roman Catholic cathedrals in Tonga
Buildings and structures in Nukuʻalofa